Kane Cleal (born 5 April 1984) is an Australian professional rugby league footballer who formerly played in the NRL. He played for the Manly-Warringah Sea Eagles, Canterbury-Bankstown Bulldogs and the South Sydney Rabbitohs.

Background

Kane is the son of Manly, NSW and Australian rugby league footballer, Noel Cleal. He played his junior rugby league for the Warialda Wombats. Cleal completed his schooling at Gilroy College, Castle Hill.

Playing career
Cleal made his first grade debut for Manly-Warringah in Round 3 of the 2004 NRL season against Cronulla-Sutherland at Shark Park. Cleal made nine appearances in his debut season, and another five in 2005.

In the 2006 NRL season, Cleal joined South Sydney. He played nine games for Souths as the club finished last on the table. Cleal was subsequently released by Souths and he joined Canterbury-Bankstown for the 2007 NRL season.

Cleal scored his first try for Canterbury-Bankstown in the 2007 Good Friday clash against his former club South Sydney, with the Bulldogs winning 34-10.

Cleal suffered a severe broken jaw on 8th July 2007 in a tackle with Cronulla-Sutherland Sharks prop Ben Ross. The second such injury of his career, the first occurring in the 2002 S.G Ball Cup grand final, it ended his 2007 season. In the 2008 NRL season, Cleal only played four games for Canterbury as they club finished last on the table and claimed the wooden spoon.

Cleal resigned with South Sydney for the 2009 and 2010 seasons. However, he suffered a career-ending hand injury during pre-season training and retired from the game at the end of 2009. 

In 2013, Cleal signed on to play one game for the Coolah Kangaroos in the Castlereagh Cup.

References

External links
Kane Cleal Souths Profile
Kane Cleal Bulldogs Profile

1984 births
Australian rugby league players
Manly Warringah Sea Eagles players
South Sydney Rabbitohs players
Canterbury-Bankstown Bulldogs players
Rugby league props
Living people
Rugby league players from Sydney